St. John's Regional Seminary is the theologate of the Catholic Church of Andhra Pradesh and Telangana. It is a major seminary training students to become priests.

St. John's Regional Seminary is situated in Ramanthapur in Hyderabad.

Affiliation
The seminary is listed as a Major Seminary under the Roman Curia.

Background
St. John's Regional Seminary was founded in 1965 in Ramanthapur, Hyderabad, to train priests for the Catholic Church in Andhra Pradesh. In 1987, the seminary was divided into two. The theologiate was retained in Hyderabad while the philosophate (St. John's Regional Seminary (Philosophate)) was moved to Kothavalasa in the northern circars of Andhra Pradesh.

Board of Governors
The ten bishops and two archbishops in the state of Andhra Pradesh are ex officio members of the Board of Governors of St. John's Regional Seminary:
 Archdiocese of Hyderabad - Archbishop Poola Anthony
 Archdiocese of Visakhapatnam - Archbishop Mallavarapu Prakash
 Diocese of Srikakulam - Bishop Rayarala Vijaya Kumar
 Diocese of Eluru -  Bishop Polimera Jaya Rao
 Diocese of Vijayawada - Bishop Telagathoti Joseph Raja Rao
 Diocese of Guntur - Bishop Chinnabathini Bhagyaiah
 Diocese of Nellore - Bishop D. M. Prakasam
 Diocese of Kadapa - Apostolic Administrator - Bishop Gali Bali
 Diocese of Kurnool - Administrator - Anthonappa Chowrappa
 Diocese of Nalgonda - Bishop Govindu Joji
 Diocese of Warangal - Bishop Udumala Bala
 Diocese of Khammam - Bishop M. Paul

Admissions
The seminary follows a semester system. Admission is for Catholic pupils who are eligible to pursue priestly studies and from any of the ten Catholic dioceses and two archdioceses in Andhra Pradesh.

See also
Other University-affiliated seminaries in Telangana region
 Andhra Christian Theological College, Hyderabad
 Mennonite Brethren Centenary Bible College, Shamshabad

References

External links 
 St John's Seminary, Hyderabad

Christian seminaries and theological colleges in India
Catholic seminaries
Universities and colleges in Hyderabad, India
Educational institutions established in 1965
1965 establishments in Andhra Pradesh